Richmond Court is a historic apartment complex at 1209–1217 Beacon Street in Brookline, Massachusetts. Designed by Ralph Adams Cram and built in 1898, this was probably the first apartment house built in the northeastern United States that resembled an English Tudor manor house. This attractive design made the building a fashionable alternative to more utilitarian apartment complex designs.

The complex was listed on the National Register of Historic Places in 1985, and included later that year in the Beacon Street Historic District.

See also
 National Register of Historic Places listings in Brookline, Massachusetts

References

Historic districts in Norfolk County, Massachusetts
Ralph Adams Cram buildings
Brookline, Massachusetts
National Register of Historic Places in Brookline, Massachusetts
Historic district contributing properties in Massachusetts
Historic districts on the National Register of Historic Places in Massachusetts